The Land of the Silver Apples is a fantasy novel for children, written by Nancy Farmer and published by Atheneum in 2007. It is a sequel to The Sea of Trolls, second in a series of three (as of 2013) known as the Sea of Trolls series.
The title refers to the "silver apples of the moon" associated with the land of faerie in W. B. Yeats' poem "The Song of Wandering Angus". The book received the Emperor Norton Award (2007).

Plot summary
Jack and his companions take Lucy to a shrine where the demons she is believed to harbor may be cast out, but things go badly wrong.  Lucy is abducted by the Lady of the Lake and Jack must follow her underground to the lands of the hobgoblins and elves.  He meets Thorgil again and, with her and a new friend, Pega, must face tests beyond anything they can imagine.  They must learn to see through the enchantments of the elves (who are the fallen angels) and to face still darker powers in the underworld.

References

External links

2007 American novels
2007 children's books
2007 fantasy novels
American children's novels
Children's fantasy novels
Novels by Nancy Farmer
Novels set in the Viking Age
The Sea of Trolls Trilogy
Atheneum Books books